Murus Gallicus (Latin for "Gallic Wall") is an abstract strategy game created in 2009 by Phil Leduc. The name Murus Gallicus is a reference to the stone walls used in the Gallic wars that took place in Gaul, now modern day France. The game has two win conditions that mimic Julius Caesar's strategy of surrounding the gauls. The first is breakthrough, reaching the other side of the board, and the second, stalemate, putting the opponent in a position where they cannot make a legal move.

Rules 
Murus Gallicus is played on an 8x7 or 8x8 board with the First and Last Rank filled with stones stacked two high on each cell. One set is white, and one black. The white pieces are "Romans" and the Black pieces "Gauls." The Romans move first.

Movement 
There are two types of pieces in Murus Gallicus, a wall and a tower.

A wall consists of a single stone, and cannot move. It can, however, block an opponent's movement.

A tower, consists of two stones stacked on top of each other. A tower can block an opponent like a wall, but it can also move in any direction, picking the whole stack up and placing a single stone on each empty space or allied wall it passes by. When a tower is moved no stones may be left behind, nor is a tower allowed to skip over any empty spaces without leaving behind a single stone. If a tower is distributed so that one of its pieces lands on an allied wall, the allied wall becomes a tower. The player may not place a stone onto an enemy stone, and they may not stack their pieces higher than two stones.

Capture 
If a tower is adjacent to an enemy wall, both diagonally and orthogonally in all directions, it may capture it by sacrificing one of its stones and become a wall. Both pieces are removed from the board

Victory Conditions 
The player who reaches the other side of the board first, or stalemates their opponent so that they can't make a legal move, wins the game.

History 
Murus Gallicus was the result of a long process of improvements on a nameless stacking game that the creator, Phil Leduc, felt was too similar to a different game called Tumbling Down. After playtesting, Leduc limited the stacking limit to two, removed capture, and changed the goal of the game to revolve around stalemating the opponent. With these changes, his nameless stacking game evolved into what Phil Leduc dubbed "Houdini." Houdini was workable but Leduc thought that blockades were a real problem, with players able to simply move back and forth and avoid stalemates. He added a new capture mechanic back into the game that involved sacrificing your own stone and gave birth to Murus Gallicus.

The name came from Leduc's fascination with Latin and while looking through Latin words came upon the word "Murus". This led him to the fortification structures known as "Murus Gallicus" and through that the Gallic wars. Murus Gallicus suggested both a name and a theme for the game which he expanded upon by naming certain tactics after Roman weaponry such as "The chariot" or "The battering ram."

In September, 2009, Murus Gallicus was published virtually as a free to play game on iggamecenter.com and was published physically shortly thereafter by Nestor Games.

In attempt to receive more attention and reviews on the review site Boardgamegeek.com, Phil Leduc later added catapults to the game and created Advanced Murus Gallicus.

Variants

Advanced Murus Gallicus 
Advanced Murus Gallicus adds Catapults to the game. Catapults are stones stacked three high and can block an opponent's movement like walls and towers. They may not move, but the can "throw" their third stone two or three spaces away in any direction onto an empty square or enemy occupied square. Once the stone has been thrown the stack becomes a Tower and functions accordingly.

If a thrown stone lands on an empty square it becomes a wall. If it lands on an enemy occupied square it reduces the stack present by one, either destroying a wall, reducing a tower to a wall, or reducing a catapult to a tower.

A tower may sacrifice a single stone, becoming a wall, and reduce an adjacent Catapult to a tower. It may also sacrifice itself entirely and reduce an adjacent catapult to a wall.

The movement of towers and the blocking power of walls and towers remains the same as in Murus Gallicus.

Trivia 

 Murus Gallicus was featured in the New Abstract Games Magazine for uniquely combining stalemate and breakthrough conditions, which are rarely found in modern abstracts
 Murus Gallicus was featured in David Ploog's list of strategy guides for games that matter.
 Murus Gallicus is featured in Stephen Tavener's AiAi program
 Murus Gallicus is currently published over the board by Nestorgames and online at iggamecenter
 Standard Murus Gallicus has an estimated game tree complexity of 10^101 on an 8x7 board.

References 

Abstract strategy games
Board games
Board games introduced in 2009